Sarah Hamilton may refer to:

 Sarah Hamilton (historian), British historian
 Sarah Hamilton (actress), Irish stage actress and singer